The Memorial Cup All-Star Team is an annual selection of the best players at the Memorial Cup tournament. Six recipients are chosen for each Memorial Cup tournament: one goaltender, two defencemen, and three forwards. Players named to a Memorial Cup All-Star Team are also considered for the other four Memorial Cup tournament awards. The first All-Star team was selected in 1975.

Teams
List of Memorial Cup all-star teams:

See also
List of Canadian Hockey League awards

References

External links
 Mastercard Memorial Cup
 History – Awards – Mastercard Memorial Cup

Canadian Amateur Hockey Association trophies
Canadian Hockey League trophies and awards